Souleymane Kone (born 1 May 1996) is an Ivorian footballer.

Career
On 10 February 2015, Ararat Yerevan announced the signing of Kone.

On 23 December 2016 Djurgårdens announced the signing of Kone on a three-year contract.

On 10 January 2018 Kone joined DAC Dunajská Streda on loan until 31 December 2018.

Career statistics

Club

References

External links
 

1996 births
People from Grand-Bassam
Living people
Ivorian footballers
Association football defenders
FC Ararat Yerevan players
Djurgårdens IF Fotboll players
FC DAC 1904 Dunajská Streda players
K.V.C. Westerlo players
Wisła Kraków players

Armenian Premier League players
Slovak Super Liga players
Challenger Pro League players
Ekstraklasa players

Ivorian expatriate footballers
Expatriate footballers in Armenia
Ivorian expatriate sportspeople in Armenia
Expatriate footballers in Sweden
Ivorian expatriate sportspeople in Sweden
Expatriate footballers in Slovakia
Ivorian expatriate sportspeople in Slovakia
Expatriate footballers in Belgium
Ivorian expatriate sportspeople in Belgium
Expatriate footballers in Poland
Ivorian expatriate sportspeople in Poland